Jason Miller (born March 1, 1971) is a Canadian former professional ice hockey left winger who played six games in the National Hockey League for the New Jersey Devils.

Playing career
Born in Edmonton, Alberta, Miller was drafted 18th overall by the New Jersey Devils in the 1989 NHL Entry Draft.

Miller was also an indirect participant in one of the most important trades in NHL history. Almost a year prior to the 1989 NHL Entry Draft, the Edmonton Oilers traded "The Great One" Wayne Gretzky, along with Marty McSorley and Mike Krushelnyski, to the Los Angeles Kings for Jimmy Carson, Martin Gelinas, $15 million in cash, and the Kings' first-round draft picks in 1989, 1991, and 1993. The Oilers later traded their 1989 first-round draft pick to the New Jersey Devils who drafted Miller 18th-overall in the 1989 NHL Entry Draft.

He was assigned to the American Hockey League for the Utica Devils and then the Albany River Rats.  In three seasons, Miller played just six NHL games for New Jersey and failed to register a point.  After a season with the Adirondack Red Wings, Miller moved  to Europe with a spell in Finland's SM-liiga with HPK and in Germany's Deutsche Eishockey Liga with Kaufbeurer Adler before returning to the United States in the International Hockey League with the Peoria Rivermen and the San Antonio Dragons.

In 1996, Miller returned to Germany, spending one season with Düsseldorfer EG before moving to the Nürnberg Ice Tigers where he spent four seasons.  He spent one more season in the DEL with the Hamburg Freezers before dropping down to the 2nd Bundesliga and signing with the SERC Wild Wings.  He then spent four seasons with Eisbären Regensburg before joining Dresdner Eislöwen in 2008. after Regensburg withdrew from the league due to financial difficulties. During his second season with Dresdner, with the team slumping and in need for injury replacements, Miller was released from his contract on January 25, 2010.

Career statistics

Awards
 WHL East Second All-Star Team – 1991

References

External links

1971 births
Adirondack Red Wings players
Albany River Rats players
Canadian ice hockey left wingers
Dresdner Eislöwen players
Düsseldorfer EG players
EV Regensburg players
Hamburg Freezers players
HPK players
Ice hockey people from Edmonton
Kaufbeurer Adler players
Living people
Medicine Hat Tigers players
National Hockey League first-round draft picks
New Jersey Devils draft picks
New Jersey Devils players
Nürnberg Ice Tigers players
Peoria Rivermen (IHL) players
San Antonio Dragons players
Schwenninger Wild Wings players
Utica Devils players
Canadian expatriate ice hockey players in Finland
Canadian expatriate ice hockey players in Germany
Canadian expatriate ice hockey players in the United States